Patrick Carr Holton (23 December 1935 – 19 December 2014) was a Scottish footballer, who played for Hamilton Academical, Motherwell, Chelsea, Southend United and St Johnstone.

References

External links
 

1935 births
2014 deaths
Scottish footballers
Hamilton Academical F.C. players
Motherwell F.C. players
Chelsea F.C. players
Southend United F.C. players
St Johnstone F.C. players
Scottish Football League players
English Football League players
Wishaw Juniors F.C. players
Association football fullbacks
Footballers from Hamilton, South Lanarkshire
Douglas Water Thistle F.C. players
Scottish Junior Football Association players